Matthew Smith (born December 20, 1977) is a retired American competitor in lightweight rowing. He won a silver medal at the 2007 Pan American Games and placed ninth at the 2004 Olympics in the coxless fours. Previously he won a bronze medal in the eights at the 2002 World Championships.

After graduating from the University of Wisconsin–Madison in 2000 Smith joined the U.S. Army, eventually reaching the rank of Captain and earning the Bronze Star and Meritorious Service Medal. While serving in the army he continued rowing and graduated from the United States Army Airborne School and Ranger School. In 2022 Matt was inducted into the University of Wisconsin-Madison Army ROTC Hall of Fame.

Smith started training rowers back in 2002 when he was still associated with the University of Wisconsin. In 2012–2013 he became assistant coach for the national under-23 team, and in 2014 was promoted to head coach.

Smith is married to Hilary Gehman, who is also a rowing coach; they have two sons, Luke and Carson.

References

1977 births
Living people
People from Woodbridge, Virginia
University of Wisconsin–Madison alumni
Sportspeople from Virginia
Olympic rowers of the United States
Rowers at the 2004 Summer Olympics
American male rowers
Pan American Games medalists in rowing
Pan American Games silver medalists for the United States
World Rowing Championships medalists for the United States
Rowers at the 2007 Pan American Games
Medalists at the 2007 Pan American Games
U.S. Army World Class Athlete Program